The Universal Masters Collection: LUV is a budget-priced compilation album by Dutch girl group Luv' released by Universal Music Netherlands in 2001. It includes songs from the most prosperous phase of the formation's career (1977–1979) as they were under contract with Phonogram/Philips Records. The rights to the Phonogram back catalogue are held by Mercury Records/Universal Music. 
Hit singles like "You're the Greatest Lover", "Trojan Horse" and "Casanova" were successful in a large part of Continental Europe.

Track listing
All tracks written by Hans van Hemert and Piet Souer under the pseudonym 'Janschen & Janschens'.

"U.O.Me" – 2:57
 Taken from the album With Luv' (1978)
 "Trojan Horse" – 3:24
 taken from the German Version of With Luv' (1978)
"You're the Greatest Lover" – 2:50
 Taken from the album With Luv' (1978)
"My Man" – 3:05
 Taken from the album With Luv' (1978)
"Sugar Babe" – 2:43
 Taken from the album With Luv' (1978)
"Don Juanito de Carnaval" – 3:11
 Taken from the album With Luv' (1978)
"Life Is on My Side" – 2:38
 B-side of "Trojan Horse", taken from the album With Luv' (1978)
"Casanova" – 3:50
 Taken from the album Lots of Luv' (1979)
"Eeny Meeny Miny Moe" – 2:53
 Taken from the album Lots of Luv' (1979)
"DJ" – 3:21
 B-side of "Casanova", taken from the album Lots of Luv' (1979)
"Shoes Off (Boots On)" – 3:07
 Taken from the album Lots of Luv' (1979)
"Marcellino" – 3:14
 Taken from the album Lots of Luv' (1979)
"Dandy" – 2:47
 Taken from the album Lots of Luv' (1979)
"Dream, Dream" – 3:30
 Taken from the album With Luv' (1978)
"Everybody's Shaking Hands on Broadway" – 3:24
 B-side of "You're the Greatest Lover", taken from the album With Luv' (1978)
"I Like Sugar Candy Kisses" – 3:33
 Taken from the album Lots of Luv' (1979)
"Don't Let Me Down" – 2:37
 B-side of "My Man"
"Eres Mi Mejor Amante" – 2:57
 Spanish Version of "You're the Greatest Lover"

Personnel
 José Hoebee – vocals
 Patty Brard – vocals
 Marga Scheide – vocals

Production
 Hans van Hemert – producer, songwriter
 Piet Souer – conductor/arranger

External links
 Detailed Luv' discography at Rate Your Music
 Detailed Luv' discography at Discogs

Luv' albums
2001 greatest hits albums